Qusqu Qhawarina (Quechua qusqu boundary stone; nucleus; navel; heap of earth and stones; bed, dry bed of a lake, Qusqu Cusco (a city), qhawarina, qhawana viewpoint, here translated to "boundary stone viewpoint", Hispanicized spelling Cusco Jahuarina) is a  mountain in the Cusco Region in Peru. It is situated in the Quispicanchi Province, on the border of the districts of Andahuaylillas and Lucre.
Qusqu Qhawarina lies on the left bank of the Willkanuta River, northeast of a mountain named Saywa (Quechua for boundary stone, landmark).

References 

Mountains of Peru
Mountains of Cusco Region